XHLCE-FM is a noncommercial (social) radio station on 90.1 FM in La Cruz, Sinaloa under the name "Óscar FM". It is owned by Radio Agricultores del Valle de Sinaloa, A.C. and operated by GPM Grupo Promomedios, which also owns the local cable system in La Cruz.

History
XHLCE went on air May 11, 2017, after receiving its concession the year before. Within a year, it ditched its original name "Yess FM" and became "Óscar FM".

References

Radio stations in Sinaloa